Bishop Ranch is a large business park in San Ramon, California. Tenants include AT&T, Chevron, Bank of the West, PG&E, Robert Half International, Ford Motor Company, SAP, General Electric, and JPMorgan Chase. Over 30,000 employees work in Bishop Ranch.

Bishop Ranch and the East Bay Regional Park District's Bishop Ranch Regional Preserve were originally part of a 3,000-acre parcel of land called Norris Ranch. Western Electric acquired Bishop Ranch in 1955 to house a manufacturing plant. Sunset Development Company purchased the 585-acre parcel from Western Electric in 1978. In 2003, Chevron moved its international headquarters to Bishop Ranch.

In November 2018, Sunset Development Company unveiled City Center Bishop Ranch. City Center is a shopping, dining and entertainment destination for the community of San Ramon, as well as the greater Tri-Valley.

At 1.8 million square feet, the park's anchor building, 2600 Bishop Ranch, is the second-largest office building in the Bay Area, after Apple Park (2.8 million square feet).

Origins 

The property that is now Bishop Ranch was farmland deeded to Thomas Bishop, a lawyer, as payment for his work in the separation of a Mr. and Mrs. Norris in 1891. Over the following decades, Bishop and his family expanded the ranch with pear trees, walnut groves and herds of sheep.

Transportation 
Bishop Ranch is one bus ride from both the Walnut Creek and Dublin BART stations, with service on County Connection bus routes including 96X, 97X and 35. The 35 serving busses (Not X) Dougherty Valley and Dublin BART run throughout the day.

References

External links
 Bishop Ranch

Business parks of the United States
 
Shopping malls established in 2018